The locomotive locally known as "Big Ben" was built by Baldwin Locomotive Works as an 0-6-0 ST type in 1919 as their works number 5212. The locomotive was exported in a new condition on a steamer from New York to Tasmania, Australia, where it was used by the Public Works Department on the Marrawah Tramway in Tasmania's far north west running between Smithton and Marrawah.

On the Marrawah Tramway, the locomotive was locally known as "Big Ben", however it was also referred to as Marrawah tramway No. 3.  When the Tasmanian Government Railways took over the Marrawah tramway in 1929, the engine passed into their ownership. Big Ben was apparently light on the front wheels and as a result, the front was often prone to rise above the wheels when running front first.  On the 6 September 1938 when running with a load of logs the wheels risen up again but when they came down they didn't find the rails resulting in a derailment which caused the driver to die from injuries the next day. After this incident, a load of old rails were tied to the front of the engine to weigh it down.

In April 1946, Big Ben was sent to Launceston to receive a general overhaul but was only used as a standby engine on the tram due to the Tasmanian Government Railways introduction of more powerful locomotives.
In mid 1948 the Tasmanian Government Railways sent Big Ben to work on the Parattah to Oatlands railway in southern Tasmania because the other engines working it were needed on other branch lines.

In 1949 after the Parattah to Oatlands lines closure Big Ben was sent to Launceston as a shunter and was scrapped in October 1951.

External links 
Hudswell Clarke B/N 380 of 1891 - Buried in the Marrawah Tip
Hudswell Clarke 380 of 1891

0-6-0 locomotives
Baldwin locomotives
Individual locomotives of Australia
Steam locomotives of Tasmania
Scrapped locomotives